Port Granby Creek is a stream in the municipality of Clarington, Regional Municipality of Durham in Ontario, Canada. It feeds into Lake Ontario, which it reaches at the community of Port Granby, after which it is named.

Course
It heads southwest, passes under Ontario Highway 401, and turns south. The creek flows under the Canadian Pacific Railway and Canadian National Railway main lines and reaches its mouth at Lake Ontario at the community of Port Granby. Lake Ontario flows via the Saint Lawrence River to the Gulf of Saint Lawrence.

References

Rivers of the Regional Municipality of Durham